Rafael "Rafa" Jofresa Prats (born September 2, 1966 in Barcelona, Catalonia) is a Spanish retired professional basketball player. At a height of 1.83 m (6'0") tall, he played at the point guard position.

Professional career
Jofresa played in 756 games (the 2nd-most all-time) in the top-tier level Spanish ACB League. He was a member of the FIBA European Selection team, in 1995.

National team career
Jofresa was a member of the senior Spain national basketball team. He had 75 appearances with Spain's senior national team. He won a bronze medal at the 1991 EuroBasket.

Personal life
Jofresa's brother, Tomás, was also a professional basketball player.

Awards and titles won

Spain
 Liga ACB (Spanish League) (3): 1990–91, 1991–92, 1996–97
 Copa Príncipe de Asturias (Spanish Prince's Cup) (2): 1986–87, 1988–89, 1990–91

Europe
 FIBA Korać Cup (1): 1989–90
 EuroLeague (1): 1993–94

References

External links
 FIBA Profile
 FIBA Europe Profile
 Spanish League Profile  
 
 
 
 

1966 births
Living people
Basketball players at the 1992 Summer Olympics
CB Girona players
FC Barcelona Bàsquet players
Joventut Badalona players
Liga ACB players
Olympic basketball players of Spain
Point guards
Spanish men's basketball players
1990 FIBA World Championship players
Basketball players from Barcelona
1994 FIBA World Championship players